Jhala Nath Khanal (born 20 May 1950) is a Nepalese politician who was the 35th Prime Minister of Nepal from February 2011 to August 2011. He was previously the chairman of the Communist Party of Nepal (Unified Marxist–Leninist) (CPN (UML)) and Leader of the Constituent Assembly Parliamentary Party of the CPN (UML). 

Since 18 August 2021, he has been serving as the senior leader of the CPN (Unified Socialist), a new party formed through split in CPN (UML) citing arrogance and monopoly of the party president KP Sharma Oli.

Personal life
Khanal was born in Sakhejung of Ilam District.

Political life

Early political career 
Khanal was a member of the Communist Party of Nepal (Marxist-Leninist), and was its General Secretary from 1982 to 1986. Later, he became member of the Communist Party of Nepal (Unified Marxist–Leninist).

Government posts 
Khanal served for a time as Minister of Information and Communication in the 1997 coalition government under Surya Bahadur Thapa.

Khanal won the seat of the Ilam 1 constituency in the 2008 Constituent Assembly election. He led the CPN (UML) as General Secretary from 2008 to February 2009 and was elected as the Chairman of the CPN (UML) on February 16, 2009.

Premiership 

On 3 February 2011, after seven months of political gridlock in which no candidate could muster enough votes to be elected as Prime Minister, Jhala Nath Khanal was elected as Prime Minister by the Constituent Assembly. Khanal received 368 votes in the 601-member parliament, while his nearest rivals, Ram Chandra Poudel of the Nepali Congress got 122 votes and Bijay Kumar Gachhedar of Madhesi Jana Adhikar Forum (Loktantrik) got 67 votes.

Nepal had no proper government since Madhav Kumar Nepal resigned in June 2010. Nepal ran interim government for nearly eight months. Sixteen rounds of voting in parliament since July were unable to produce a new Prime minister as no political party could muster a majority. However, on 3 February 2011 the Unified Communist Party of Nepal (Maoist) withdrew its candidate, Pushpa Kamal Dahal, and backed Khanal. As a result, he became the third Prime Minister of Nepal since it became a federal democratic republic in 2008. 

Khanal resigned on 29 August 2011 after nearly six months after the parties failed to agree on the constitution drafting and the peace process amidst a new political crisis. The extended duration of Constituent Assembly were to expire on 31 August 2011.

The Neapli Congress and the Madhesi parties had asked the Prime Minister to resign immediately after being unsuccessful in completing peace process and drafting a new constitution. Even the party leaders increased pressure on Mr. Khanal in order to prevent the party from notoriety.

Electoral history

2017 legislative elections

2013 Constituent Assembly election

2011 Parliamentary Prime Minister election

2008 Constituent Assembly election

1999 legislative elections

1994 legislative elections

1991 legislative elections

See also
 2021 split in Communist Party of Nepal (Unified Marxist-Leninist)

References

Further reading

External links

Official website of CPN UML

|-

1950 births
Living people
People from Ilam District
Communist Party of Nepal (Unified Socialist) politicians
Nepalese Hindus
Bahun
Government ministers of Nepal
Members of the National Assembly (Nepal)
Prime ministers of Nepal
Nepal MPs 2017–2022
Nepal Communist Party (NCP) politicians
Nepal MPs 1991–1994
Nepal MPs 1994–1999
21st-century prime ministers of Nepal
Khas people
Members of the 1st Nepalese Constituent Assembly
Members of the 2nd Nepalese Constituent Assembly
Communist Party of Nepal (Unified Marxist–Leninist) politicians